Hertford County is a county located in the U.S. state of North Carolina. As of the 2020 census, the population was 21,552. Its county seat is Winton. It is classified within the region known in the 21st century as the Inner Banks.

History
Hertford County is home of the Meherrin Indian Tribe, descendants of indigenous people who had inhabited the region for many centuries. After decades of encroachment by English colonists, the Tribe moved south from Virginia, where they settled in 1706 on a reservation abandoned by the Chowanoke. This six-square-mile reservation was at Parker's Ferry near the mouth of the Meherrin River. It was confirmed by a treaty of 1726. However, they were not able to keep the reservation lands.

The Tribe today has approximately 900 enrolled members, most living within 10–15 miles of the former reservation. The tribe is recognized by the state and is seeking Federal recognition. The Meherrin have an annual Pow Wow at the end of October.

The county was formed in 1759 from parts of Bertie County, Chowan County, and Northampton County. It was named for Francis Seymour-Conway, 1st Earl of Hertford, later 1st Marquess of Hertford.

In 1779 the northeastern part of Hertford County was combined with parts of Chowan County and Perquimans County to form Gates County.

Geography

Major water bodies 
 Ahoskie River
 Cutawhiskie Creek
 Chowan River
 Indian Creek
 Meherrin River
 Panther Creek
 Potecasi Creek
 Tukey Creek
 Turnpike Branch
 Wiccacon River

Adjacent counties
 Southampton County, Virginia – north
 Gates County – east
 Chowan County – southeast
 Bertie County – south
 Northampton County – west

Major highways

Major infrastructure 
 Parker's Ferry, River ferry across the Meherrin River.

Demographics

2020 census

As of the 2020 United States census, there were 21,552 people, 8,845 households, and 5,419 families residing in the county.

2010 census
As of the census of 2010, there were 24,669 people, 8,953 households, and 6,240 families residing in the county. The population density was 64 people per square mile (25/km2). There were 9,724 housing units at an average density of 28 per square mile (11/km2). The racial makeup of the county was 60.5% Black or African American, 35.6% White, 1.1% Native American, 0.5% Asian, 0.0% Pacific Islander, 0.8% from other races, and 1.0% from two or more races. 1.4% of the population were Hispanic or Latino of any race.

There were 8,953 households, out of which 30.00% had children under the age of 18 living with them, 45.80% were married couples living together, 19.50% had a female householder with no husband present, and 30.30% were non-families. 26.90% of all households were made up of individuals, and 12.10% had someone living alone who was 65 years of age or older. The average household size was 2.48 and the average family size was 2.99.

In the county, the population was spread out, with 25.30% under the age of 18, 7.80% from 18 to 24, 26.30% from 25 to 44, 24.80% from 45 to 64, and 15.80% who were 65 years of age or older. The median age was 39 years. For every 100 females there were 85.00 males. For every 100 females age 18 and over, there were 79.50 males.

The median income for a household in the county was $26,422, and the median income for a family was $32,002. Males had a median income of $26,730 versus $20,144 for females. The per capita income for the county was $15,641. About 15.90% of families and 18.30% of the population were below the poverty line, including 21.30% of those under age 18 and 21.00% of those age 65 or over.

Government and politics
Hertford County is a member of the Mid-East Commission regional council of governments.

As of October 2022, 66 percent of registered voters in Hertford County are Democrats—the highest Democratic registration rate statewide—while Republicans have their lowest county registration rate.

Economy
Several large employers are located in Hertford County, including a privately run federal prison, Chowan University, a Nucor steel mill, several Perdue poultry processing facilities, an aluminum extrusion facility in Winton, and a lumber-processing facility in Ahoskie. These industries, combined with a typical range of local retail, restaurant and service businesses, combine to give Hertford County one of the lowest unemployment rates in Northeastern North Carolina.  The larger area has historically lagged behind the rest of the state in terms of economic development.

Education
Hertford County Public Schools has seven schools ranging from pre-kindergarten to twelfth grade. These include three high schools (the main high school being Hertford County High School), one middle school, and three elementary schools. The North Carolina Department of Public Instruction rated the county school system as "low-performing" for the 2021–2022 school year.

Media
Hertford County is served by the Roanoke-Chowan News-Herald newspaper.  There are five radio stations in Hertford County: WDLZ FM 98.3, an Adult Contemporary radio station and WWDR AM 1080, an Adult Urban Contemporary radio station, are located in Murfreesboro.  WQDK FM 99.3, a Country Music radio station and WRCS AM 970, an Urban Gospel radio station, are located in Ahoskie.  WBKU FM 91.7, a non-commercial, Contemporary Christian Music radio station which also broadcasts programming from the American Family Radio network, is located in Ahoskie.

Communities

Towns
 Ahoskie (largest town)
 Como
 Harrellsville
 Murfreesboro
 Winton (county seat)

Census-designated place
 Cofield

Townships
 Ahoskie
 Harrellsville
 Maneys Neck
 Murfreesboro
 St. John's
 Winton

See also
 List of counties in North Carolina
 National Register of Historic Places listings in Hertford County, North Carolina

References

External links

 
 

 
1759 establishments in North Carolina
Populated places established in 1759
Black Belt (U.S. region)
Majority-minority counties in North Carolina